The Bosuilstadion is an association football stadium in the city of Antwerp, Belgium. The stadium was opened in 1923 and has been the home of Royal Antwerp ever since. It has a capacity of 16,144, of which 800 are indoor VIP seats. It is located in the district of Deurne.

The Bosuilstadion hosted the 1964 European Cup Winners' Cup Final replay, which sealed the victory of Sporting Clube de Portugal against MTK Budapest FC. It also hosted the UEFA Euro 1972 semifinal between Belgium and West Germany, won by West Germany. Many friendly international games of Belgium were played at the Bosuil, many of which were against the Netherlands. However, the stadium has not hosted an international game since a friendly match Germany against Brazil in 1988.

A major reconstruction of the stadium started in 2017.

References

UEFA Euro 1972 stadiums
Football venues in Flanders
Sports venues in Antwerp Province
Buildings and structures in Antwerp
Royal Antwerp F.C.